The 1977 Texas A&M Aggies football team represented Texas A&M University during the 1977 NCAA Division I football season.

Schedule

Roster

References

Texas AandM
Texas A&M Aggies football seasons
Texas AandM Aggies football